Mass killing is a concept which has been proposed by genocide scholars who wish to define incidents of non-combat killing which are perpetrated by a government or a state. A mass killing is commonly defined as the killing of group members without the intention to eliminate the whole group, or otherwise the killing of large numbers of people without a clear group membership.

Mass killing is used by a number of genocide scholars because genocide (its strict definition) does not cover mass killing events in which no specific ethnic or religious groups are targeted, or events in which perpetrators do not intend to eliminate whole groups or significant parts of them. Genocide scholars use different models in order to explain and predict the onset of mass killing events. There has been little consensus and no generally-accepted terminology, prompting scholars, such as Anton Weiss-Wendt, to describe comparative attempts a failure. Genocide scholarship rarely appears in mainstream disciplinary journals.

Terminology 
Several different terms are used to describe the intentional killing of large numbers of noncombatants, but there is no consensus or generally-accepted terminology. Mass killing has emerged as a "more straightforward" term than genocide or politicide. Mass killing was proposed by genocide scholars in attempts to collect a uniform global database of genocidal events and identify statistical models for prediction of onset of mass killings. Atsushi Tago and Frank Wayman reference mass killing as defined by Valentino and state that even with a lower threshold (10,000 killed per year, 1,000 killed per year, or even 1), "autocratic regimes, especially communist, are prone to mass killing generically, but not so strongly inclined (i.e. not statistically significantly inclined) toward geno-politicide." Other terms used by several authors to describe mass killings of non-combattents include:
 Classicide – "intended mass killing of entire social classes", which sociologist Michael Mann considers more apt than genocide for describing crimes committed by communist states.
 Gendercide –  the systematic killing of members of a specific gender. 
 Democide – political scientist Rudolph Rummel defined democide as "the intentional killing of an unarmed or disarmed person by government agents acting in their authoritative capacity and pursuant to government policy or high command"; according to Rummel, this definition covers a wide range of deaths, including forced labor and concentration camp victims, killings by unofficial private groups, extrajudicial summary killings and mass deaths in deliberate famines as well as killings by de facto governments, e.g. civil war killings. Rummel's democide concept is similar to geno-politicide, but there are two important differences. First, an important prerequisite for geno-politicide is government's intent to destroy a specific group. In contrast, democide deals with wider range of cases, including the cases when governments are engaged in random killing either directly or due to the acts of criminal omission and neglect. Second, whereas some lower threshold exists for a killing event to be considered geno-politicide, there is no low threshold for democide which covers any murder of any number of persons by any government.
 Genocide – under the Genocide Convention, the crime of genocide generally applies to mass murder of ethnic rather than political or social groups. Protection of political groups was eliminated from the United Nations resolution after a second vote because many states anticipated that clause to apply unneeded limitations to their right to suppress internal disturbances. Genocide is also a popular term for political killings which are studied academically as democide and politicide.
 Mass killing – referencing earlier definitions, Joan Esteban, Massimo Morelli, and Dominic Rohner define mass killings as "the killings of substantial numbers of human beings, when not in the course of military action against the military forces of an avowed enemy, under the conditions of the essential defenselessness and helplessness of the victims." Valentino defines the term as "the intentional killing of a massive number of noncombatants", where a "massive number" is at least 50,000 intentional deaths over the course of five years or less; this is the most accepted quantitative minimum threshold for the term.
 Politicide – some genocide scholars propose the concept of politicide to describe the killing of groups that would not otherwise be covered by the Genocide Convention. Barbara Harff studies genocide and politicide, sometimes shortened as geno-politicide, to include the mass killing of political, economic, ethnic, and cultural groups.

Topology 
Benjamin Valentino outlines two major categories of mass killings: dispossessive mass killing and coercive mass killing. The first category defines three types: communist, ethnic, and territorial, containing the following scenarios of ethnic cleansing, killings that accompany agrarian reforms in some Communist states, and killings during colonial expansion, among others. The second category includes the types: counterguerrilla, terrorist, and imperialist, containing the following scenarios of killing during counterinsurgent warfare, and killings as part of the imperialist conquests by the Axis powers during the World War II, among others.

Analysis 
Benjamin Valentino does not consider ideology or regime-type as an important factor that explains mass killings, and outlines Communist mass killing as a subtype of dispossessive mass killing, which is considered as a complication of original theory his book is based on. About why it occurs, Valentino states that ideology, paranoia, and racism can shape leaders' beliefs for why genocide and mass killing may be justified. Unlike Rudolph Rummel and first-generation studies, Valentino does not see authoritarianism or totalitarianism as explaining mass killing; it is not ideology or regime-type but the leader's motive that matters and can explain it, which is in line with second-generation scholarship.

Manus Midlarsky also focuses on leaders' decision making but his case selection and general conclusions are different from Valentino's. Midlarsky has a more narrower definition of the dependent variable and only analyzes three case studies (the Armenian genocide, the Holocaust, and the Rwanda genocide). Midlarsky tries to explain why individuals may comply with the culprits, why politicide rather than genocide happened in Cambodia (Cambodian genocide), and why ethnic minorities, such as Greeks in the Ottoman Empire and Jews in the Second Polish Republic, were not targeted for genocide. Like Michael Mann and Valentino to a lesser extent, Midlarsky mainly addresses genocides that did not take place. Both Midlarsky and Valentino mainly focus on proximate conditions, while Mann considers genocide within the broad context of ideologies and nation-states development.

Global databases of mass killings 
At least two global databases of mass killings are available. The first compilation by Rudolph Rummel covers a time period from the beginning of the 20th century until 1987 covering democide, while the second compilation by Barbara Harff combines politicide and genocide since 1955. The Harff database is the most frequently used by genocide scholars, while the Rummel database is a good framework for studying mass killings during the 1900–1987 period.

These data are intended mostly for statistical analysis of mass killings in attempt to identify the best predictors for their onset. According to Harff, these data are not necessarily the most accurate for a given country, since some sources are general genocide scholars and not experts on local history. A comparative analysis of the Yugoslav data in two databases revealed a significant difference between the figures of killed per years and low correlation between Rummel's and Harff's data sets. Tomislav Dulić criticized Rummel's generally higher numbers as arising from flaws in Rummel's statistical methodology, and Rummel's response was not convincing.

Another comparative analysis of the two complete databases by Atsushi Tago and Frank W. Wayman revealed that the significant difference between the figures is explained by Harff's dataset of politicide-geoncide being essentially a subset of Rummel's dataset, where he includes other types of killings in addition to politicide-genocide.

See also 

 List of battles and other violent events by death toll
 List of genocides by death toll
 List of wars and anthropogenic disasters by death toll
Mass killings under communist regimes
Genocide of indigenous peoples
Anti-communist mass killings

Notes

References

Bibliography

Further reading

External links 
 
 
 
 
 
 
 
 

Genocide studies
Killings by type
Mass murder
War crimes